Boggulkunta is a commercial area in Hyderabad, the capital city of Telangana, India. It lies between the commercial areas of Abids and Koti.

Commercial area and hospitals
It is surrounded by Abids and Koti. There is a very old church of Medak diocese built by Posnett and besides this church, the church owned building 'Posnett Bhavan' let out to Government and private agencies is available. In the third floor of the Building there is Directorate of Census Operations, Telangana office.

Fernandez Maternity Hospital is located over here. The King Koti Palace is also located here.
The King Koti palace has a unique Gate known as "Pardha Gate". Once the Nizam of Hyderabad used to reside in this very Palace.

Very recently Kameneni Hospitals has been established which is becoming increasingly popular in the Hyderabad city. There are some popular restaurants like Kolani's Kitchen and Mayur Pan shop etc.

Transport
The state run TSRTC has a big bus junction at close by koti to all parts of the city. The closest MMTS Train Station is at Kachiguda or Malakpet.

School
There is an educational institute named Pragathi Mahavidyalaya which has a college and a school.

References

Neighbourhoods in Hyderabad, India